Coop Breizh is a Breton cultural company founded in 1957 by Kendalc'h confederation, based in Spézet, Brittany, France. Specialized in the production, the publishing and the literary and musical distribution, it propose articles related to Breton culture, Celtic cultures and the sea. Coop Breizh is the main Breton producer and distributor for books and musical creation. There are two shops : in Lorient and in Quimper.

The company has produced singers and musicians such as Nolwenn Korbell, Frères Morvan, Soïg Siberil, Denez Prigent, Louise Ebrel, among others.

References 

 1957-1997. Coop Breizh, Depuis 40 ans au cœur de la culture bretonne, 1997
 50 ans de Coop Breizh, Coop Breizh, 2007, 235 p.

External links 

 

Publishing companies of France
French independent record labels
Companies based in Brittany
Breton culture